Zdzieci Nowe  (till December 31, 2000 as at Nowe Zdzieci with type of settlement as of colony independent) is a colony in the administrative district of Gmina Połaniec, within Staszów County, Świętokrzyskie Voivodeship, in south-central Poland.

The village has a population of  153.

Demography 
According to the 2002 Poland census, there were 155 people residing in Zdzieci Nowe village, of whom 54.8% were male and 45.2% were female. In the village, the population was spread out, with 29% under the age of 18, 36.8% from 18 to 44, 18.1% from 45 to 64, and 16.1% who were 65 years of age or older.
 Figure 1. Population pyramid of village in 2002 — by age group and sex

References

Zdzieci Nowe